CMRA can mean:

 Commercial mail receiving agency, more commonly known as a "mail drop"
 Central Motorcycle Roadracing Association
 The Canadian Marine Rescue Auxiliary, a former name for the Canadian Coast Guard Auxiliary